Kadarji Rao Scindia was the fourth Maharaja of Gwalior State for a brief period. He became Maharaja of Gwalior after two years of death of Jankoji Rao Scindia in Third  battle of Panipat in 1761. 

He was the son of Tukoji Rao Scindia, however he refused the appointment, and remained as a nominal peshwa's appointment to a new Sardar which occurred on 10 July 1764 in the person of Manaji Rao Scindia.

References

External links

Scindia dynasty of Gwalior
Year of birth missing
Year of death missing